Danbury High School is a public high school in Danbury, Connecticut, with approximately 3000 students. It is part of the Danbury Public Schools district. Despite Danbury's population of 86,518 (as of 2020), there is only one public high school, along with several small private schools, and one vocational high school in the city. The school is located in a suburban, residential neighborhood atop a hill that overlooks most of the city.

Danbury High School is supplemented by a magnet program called the Alternative Center for Excellence. This program provides a Danbury High School diploma but exhibits additional criteria not required by most local institutions.

In 2013, Danbury High School was awarded $100,000 after winning the State Farm Insurance "Celebrate My Drive" campaign. The "Celebrate My Drive" campaign encourages teens to make positive choices as they start driving.

Danbury High School was awarded a total of $40,000 after 2 student's projects won the statewide contest Voice4Change. These projects were to contribute to the water fountains and teacher's faculty lounge furniture at DHS.

History
In 1927, a new high school was built on 181 White Street in Danbury. This building served as the city's main high school, until a rapid increase in Danbury's population compelled a major school construction program. In 1965, a new Danbury High School was dedicated on Clapboard Ridge. This campus is still the current location of the school today. On October 11, 1967 rock band The Doors performed live at the school.

Academic progress and school improvement
Beginning next fall, freshmen students entering Danbury High School will have an opportunity to earn an associate degree simultaneously with their high school diploma. As part of the Early College Opportunity program, 80 to 100 incoming freshmen students will begin their journey toward an associate degree in information technology issued by Naugatuck Valley Community College.

Stadium
Constructed in 2002, Danbury High School has a multi-purpose stadium complex that is able to accommodate close to 4,000 spectators. The field surface is Astroplay brand filled field turf that can be used in all types of weather. It also features a seven-pole Universal Sports Lighting system, an electronic remote-controlled scoreboard, and heated concession building with bathrooms. The track is an eight-lane Mondo Limited Super X Surface.  In the summer of 2015, the Astroplay surface of the multi-purpose lighted field was replaced with a brand-new more grass-like artificial turf.

Media appearances
Danbury High School has been featured on TruTV's The Principal's Office.

Notable alumni

 Christina Ellington (born 1982), beauty queen and entertainer, Miss New York 2004, Top 10 Finalist in Miss America 2005
 Ken Green (born 1958), PGA Golf Professional with 5 Tour wins
 Peter Hylenski (born 19751976), Tony Award-winning sound designer
 George Radachowsky (born 1962), NFL player
 William R. Ratchford (born 1934), former U.S. Representative from Connecticut
 Allen Ritter (born 1988), record producer, songwriter, pianist and singer
 Perry Rotella (born 1963), IT executive and businessman
 Robert Joseph Shaheen (born 1937), clergyman of the Maronite Catholic Church
 Austin Calitro (born 1994), NFL player

References

External links

Buildings and structures in Danbury, Connecticut
Education in Danbury, Connecticut
Schools in Fairfield County, Connecticut
Public high schools in Connecticut
Educational institutions established in 1906
1906 establishments in Connecticut